Entreprenadaktuellt, literally translated as Contractor News, is a magazine published in Örebro, Sweden. It is free and distributed to all Swedish contractor and garden companies and is published every month.

History and profile
Entreprenadaktuellt was first published in February 2008. The magazine is owned by Agriprim AB as a service to the contractor and gardening industry. 

The publishers also publishes the magazines Skogsaktuellt and Jordbruksaktuellt.

References

External links
 Official website for Entreprenadaktuellt 

2008 establishments in Sweden
Business magazines published in Sweden
Free magazines
Magazines established in 2008
Mass media in Örebro
Monthly magazines published in Sweden
Professional and trade magazines
Swedish-language magazines